Tulloch railway station is a rural railway station in the remote Tulloch area of the Highland region of Scotland. This station is on the West Highland Line, between Corrour and Roy Bridge, sited  from Craigendoran Junction, near Helensburgh.

History 

When the railway opened on 7 August 1894 the station was named Inverlair, after the nearby Inverlair Lodge. It was renamed Tulloch on 1 January 1895.

The station was laid out with two platforms, one on either side of a crossing loop. There are sidings on the north side of the station.

The station buildings are now used as a hostel. The station was host to a LNER camping coach from 1935 to 1939.

During the construction of the Lochaber hydroelectric scheme in the 1930s, a small halt was located at Fersit, a short distance south on the line towards Corrour.

Signalling 

The signal box, which had 15 levers, was situated on the Up platform. From the time of its opening in 1894, the West Highland Railway was worked throughout by the electric token system. The semaphore signals were removed on 23 February 1986 in preparation for the introduction of Radio Electronic Token Block (RETB) by British Rail.

This resulted in the closure of Tulloch signal box and others on that part of the line. The RETB is controlled from a Signalling Centre at Banavie railway station.

The Train Protection & Warning System was installed in 2003.

Facilities 
The facilities here are incredibly basic, consisting of benches on both platforms, and a car park adjacent to platform 1. Both platforms have step-free access, but the only access to platform 2 is via a barrow crossing. As there are no facilities to purchase tickets, passengers must buy one in advance, or from the guard on the train.

Passenger volume 
With 266 entries and exits in the 2020/21 period, Tulloch is the least busy station in Scotland with direct London services, and the least busy station along the line from Glasgow Queen Street to Fort William.

The statistics cover twelve month periods that start in April.

Services 
Southbound, there are three services to Glasgow Queen Street and one service to London Euston (except Saturday nights). On Sundays, there are two services northbound to Mallaig, two services southbound to Glasgow Queen Street, and the Caledonian Sleeper to London Euston. The sleeper also carries seated coaches and can thus be used by regular travellers to both Glasgow and Edinburgh Waverley.

References

Bibliography

External Links 

 Video footage of the station on YouTube

Railway stations in Highland (council area)
Former North British Railway stations
Railway stations in Great Britain opened in 1894
Railway stations served by ScotRail
Railway stations served by Caledonian Sleeper
James Miller railway stations